Mauser Model 1924 may refer to:
 The Belgian variant of FN Model 24 and Model 30, made by FN Herstal
 The Czech Vz. 24, made by Zbrojovka Brno
 The German Standardmodell rifle, made by Mauser